Gellone may refer to:

 Gellone Abbey, located in the village of the same name, now Saint-Guilhem-le-Désert, Hérault, France
 Gellone river, a river in Saint-Guilhem-le-Désert, Hérault, France
 William of Gellone (755-812/4), otherwise Saint Guilhem, the second Count of Toulouse